DHL Ecuador (TransAm) Ltda. (Trans Am Aero Express del Ecuador) is a cargo airline based in Guayaquil. It is wholly owned by Deutsche Post and provides services for the group's DHL-branded logistics network in Ecuador. Its main base is José Joaquín de Olmedo International Airport.

History
The airline was established and started operations in 1991 as Trans Am Aero Express del Ecuador.

Destinations

Fleet

Current fleet

As of January 2021, the DHL Ecuador fleet consists of the following aircraft:

Former fleet
1 Dassault Falcon 20
1 Fairchild Swearingen Metroliner

See also
DHL Aviation
List of airlines of Ecuador

References

External links

Airlines of Ecuador
Airlines established in 1991
Cargo airlines
DHL
1991 establishments in Ecuador